The List of nuclear weapons tests is a listing of the Chinese nuclear tests conducted from 1964 through 1996. Most listings of the Chinese tests show 45 tests in the series with 45 devices, with 23 tests being atmospheric.

List

Summary

See also 
 China and weapons of mass destruction
 Chinese space program
 China Academy of Engineering Physics

References

nuclear test